Charles Corbett (March 8, 1890 – death unknown) was an American Negro league pitcher in the 1920s. 

A native of Orangeburg, South Carolina, Corbett made his Negro leagues debut in 1921 with the Pittsburgh Keystones. He played for Pittsburgh again the following season, then spent 1923 with the Indianapolis ABCs before spending his final four seasons with the Harrisburg Giants.

References

External links
 and Baseball-Reference Black Baseball stats and Seamheads

1890 births
Year of death missing
Place of death missing
Harrisburg Giants players
Hilldale Club players
Indianapolis ABCs players
Pittsburgh Keystones players
Baseball pitchers